Carlos Ingver Subero (born June 15, 1972) is a Venezuelan professional baseball coach and former player. He is currently manager for the Hanwha Eagles of the KBO League. Subero previously served as first base and infield coach for the Milwaukee Brewers.

Career
As a player, he was signed as an undrafted free agent by the Kansas City Royals in 1990 and he spent five seasons in the minors with the Royals, Pittsburgh Pirates and Texas Rangers. His last season as a player was in 1997 with the independent Meridian Brakemen of the Big South League.

He became a minor league manager in 2001, guiding the Rangers rookie league team, the Gulf Coast Rangers for two seasons, their Class A affiliate, the Clinton LumberKings from 2003-2005 and the High A Bakersfield Blaze in 2007.

In 2008, he managed the Birmingham Barons ("AA") to the second best record in the Southern League and a spot in the playoffs. He was the manager of the  Inland Empire 66ers of San Bernardino in 2009. For 2010-2012 he managed the AA Chattanooga Lookouts. For the 2013 season he  managed the Rancho Cucamonga Quakes in the California League.

Subero was hired to manage the Milwaukee Brewers' AA Huntsville Stars in 2014. In 2015 Subero guided the 1st year franchise Biloxi Shuckers to the best record in the league with 79 wins, lost in the championship in game 5. Subero took the Southern League Manager of the Year honors.

In 2015, Subero managed the Surprise Saguaros of the Arizona Fall League to the best record in the circuit, losing the championship game to the Scottsdale Scorpions.

On December 7, 2015, the Brewers hired Subero as their first base and infield coach. Subero was fired by the Brewers after the 2019 season.

On November 27, 2020, Subero was announced as the new manager for the Hanwha Eagles of the KBO League.

Personal
Subero is married and has three kids.

References

External links

1972 births
Living people
Augusta GreenJackets players
Birmingham Barons managers
Caribbean Series managers
Charlotte Rangers players
Chattanooga Lookouts managers
Eugene Emeralds players
Gulf Coast Royals players
Major League Baseball first base coaches
Meridian Brakemen players
Milwaukee Brewers coaches
Rockford Royals players
Baseball players from Caracas
Tiburones de La Guaira players
Venezuelan baseball coaches